Galleguita is a 1940 Argentine musical film written and directed by Julio Irigoyen. It premiered on 28 June 1940.

Cast
 Jorge Aldao 
 Roberto Diaz
 Alvaro Escobar
 Haydee Larroca
 Perla Mary
 Ines Murray
 Enrique Vimo

External links
 

1940 films
1940s Spanish-language films
Argentine black-and-white films
Argentine musical films
Films directed by Julio Irigoyen
1940 musical films
1940s Argentine films